Negative Dialectics is a 1966 book by the philosopher Theodor W. Adorno.

Summary

Adorno sought to update the philosophical process known as the dialectic, freeing it from traits previously attributed to it that he believed to be fictive. For Georg Wilhelm Friedrich Hegel, the dialectic was a process of realization that things contain their own negation and through this realization the parts are sublated into something greater. Adorno's dialectics rejected this positive element wherein the result was something greater than the parts that preceded and argued for a dialectics which produced something essentially negative. Adorno wrote that "Negative Dialectics is a phrase that flouts tradition. As early as Plato, dialectics meant to achieve something positive by means of negation; the thought figure of the 'negation of the negation' later became the succinct term. This book seeks to free dialectics from such affirmative traits without reducing its determinacy."

Adorno's purpose was to overcome the formal logical limits of the previous definitions of dialectics by putting into light that new knowledge arises less from 
a Hegelian unification of opposite categories as defined following Aristotelian logic than by the revelation of the limits of knowledge. Such revelation of the limits of knowledge reaches out to its experienced object, whose entirety always escapes the simplifying categories of purely theoretical thinking.
Adorno raises the possibility that philosophy and its essential link to reality may be essentially epistemological in nature. His reflection moves a step higher by applying the concept of dialectics not only to exterior objects of knowledge, but to the process of thought itself.

To summarize, "...this Negative Dialectics in which all esthetic topics are shunned might be called an “anti-system.” It attempts by means of logical consistency to substitute for the unity principle, and for the paramountcy of the superordinate concept, the idea of what would be outside the sway of such unity. To use the strength of the subject to break through the fallacy of constitutive subjectivity—this is what the author felt to be his task [...]. Stringently to transcend the official separation of pure philosophy and the substantive or formally scientific realm was one of his determining motives."

Influence

Adorno's work has had a large impact on cultural criticism, particularly through Adorno's analysis of popular culture and the culture industry. Adorno's account of dialectics has influenced Joel Kovel, the sociologist John Holloway, the anarcho-primitivist philosopher John Zerzan, the sociologist Boike Rehbein, and the Austrian musicologist Sebastian Wedler.

References

Further reading
 Dennis Redmond's updated translation of Negative Dialectics, with commentary.
 Buck-Morss, Susan.  Origin of Negative Dialectics.  Free Press, 1979.
 Jameson, Fredric.  Late Marxism: Adorno or the Persistence of the Dialectic.  Verso, 2007.
 Boucher, Geoff. Adorno Reframed. I.B. Tauris, 2013.

1966 non-fiction books
Frankfurt School
German non-fiction books
Works by Theodor W. Adorno